Go Go Berlin is a Danish rock band established in 2010 in Silkeborg, Denmark and signed with the record label Mermaid and with Sony Music for distribution. The band has released the album New Gold that charted in its first week of release in Tracklisten, the official Danish Albums Chart. Described as one of Denmark's strongest live acts, they appeared at the Roskilde Festival and Skanderborg Festival in 2013. Their second album, Electric Lives, has been recorded in Hansa Tonstudio and released in August 2015.

Members
The band is made up of:
Christian Vium – lead vocals, guitar
Anders Søndergaard – organ
Christoffer Østergaard – drums

Former members:
Mikkel Dyrehave – guitar
Emil Rothmann – bass

Discography

Albums

References

External links

Official website

Danish musical groups